Year 1407 (MCDVII) was a common year starting on Saturday (link will display the full calendar) of the Julian calendar.

Events 
 January–December 
 April 10 – After several invitations by the Yongle Emperor of China since 1403, the fifth Karmapa of the Karma Kagyu sect of Tibetan Buddhism, the lama Deshin Shekpa, finally visits the Ming dynasty capital, then at Nanjing. In his twenty-two-day visit, he thrills the Ming court with alleged miracles that are recorded in a gigantic scroll, translated into five different languages. In a show of mystical prowess, Deshin Shekpa adds legitimacy to a questionable succession to the throne by Yongle, who had killed his nephew the Jianwen Emperor in the culmination of a civil war. For his services to the Ming court, including his handling of the ceremonial rites of Yongle's deceased parents, Deshin Shekpa is awarded the title Great Treasure Prince of Dharma (大寶法王).
 June 16 – Ming–Hồ War: The Ming dynasty of China under the Yongle Emperor conquers Vietnam, capturing Hồ Quý Ly and his sons, ending the Vietnamese Hồ dynasty.
 November 20 – A solemn truce between John the Fearless, Duke of Burgundy and Louis I, Duke of Orléans is agreed under the auspicies of John, Duke of Berry.
 November 23 – The Duke of Orleans is assassinated; war breaks out again between the Burgundians and his followers.

 Date unknown 
 Rudolfo Belenzani leads a revolt against Bishop Georg von Liechtenstein in Trento, Bishopric of Trent.
 David Holbache founds Oswestry School, in the Welsh Marches.
 Mateu Texidor finishes the Puente de la Trinidad bridge in Valencia, Spain.

Births 
 March 15 – Jacob, Margrave of Baden-Baden (1431-1453) (d. 1453)
 August 27 – Ashikaga Yoshikazu, Japanese shōgun (d. 1425)
 September 21 – Leonello d'Este, Marquis of Ferrara, Italian noble (d. 1450)
 November 8 – Alain de Coëtivy, Catholic cardinal (d. 1474)
 date unknown 
Thomas de Littleton, English judge (d. 1481)
Marguerite, bâtarde de France, French noble, illegitimate daughter of the King of France (d. 1458)
Demetrios Palaiologos, Byzantine prince (d. 1470)
Lorenzo Valla, Italian humanist, philosopher, literary critic (d. 1457)

Deaths 
 February 9 – William I, Margrave of Meissen (b. 1343)
 February 16 – Abdallah Fakhr al-Din, religious leader
 March 7 – Francesco I Gonzaga, ruler of Mantua
 April 23 – Olivier de Clisson, French soldier (b. 1326)
 July – Empress Xu (Ming dynasty), Chinese Empress (b. 1362)
 November 23 – Louis I, Duke of Orléans, brother of Charles VI of France (murdered) (b. 1372)
 date unknown 
 Pero López de Ayala, Spanish soldier (b. 1332)
 Kolgrim, Norse Greenlander and alleged sorcerer

References